The 2014 Japanese Formula 3 Championship was the 36th edition of the Japanese Formula 3 Championship. It was held over 7 rounds and a total of 15 races, commencing on 12 April at Suzuka and culminating on 12 October at Fuji Speedway.

The overall championship title was won by HFDP Racing driver Nobuharu Matsushita, clinching the title with a fifth-place finish during the first race of the final meeting at Fuji. Matsushita claimed 6 wins during the season, including a hat-trick at the first Motegi meeting, and ultimately won the championship by 12 points, ahead of Kenta Yamashita, who was driving for Petronas Team TOM'S. Yamashita finished each of the first five races on the podium, and ultimately finished all bar three races on the podium during 2014; however, he was only able to win two races, winning the season opener at Suzuka as well as a race at Okayama. Third place in the championship went to Mitsunori Takaboshi, who won three races for the B-MAX Racing Team with NDDP. The remaining race victories were taken by Yamashita's team-mate Takamoto Katsuta and Daiki Sasaki (B-MAX Racing Team with NDDP), with each driver taking two wins. Petronas Team TOM'S did, however, take the teams' championship by 12 points ahead of the B-MAX Racing Team with NDDP. TOM'S also comfortable won the engine tuners' championship, 39 points clear of M-TEC.

The National class title was taken by Hanashima Racing and their driver Hiroshi Koizumi, after eight victories during the season; he also recorded the best finish for any of the drivers in the class, recording a seventh-place finish at the first Fuji meeting. Koizumi finished 27 points clear of Tochigi Le Beausset Motorsports' Rintaro Kubo, who won 5 races. Tairoku Yamaguchi finished a further 28 points in arrears, and was the only other race winner in the class, taking his sole triumph at Sugo.

Teams and drivers

All teams were Japanese-registered.

Race calendar and results
A provisional calendar for the 2014 season was released on 8 November 2013. On 10 June 2014 it was announced that the series would add two races in support of the FIA World Endurance Championship round at Fuji. All races were held in Japan.

Championship standings

Drivers' Championships
Points were awarded as follows:

Overall

National Class

Teams' Championship
Points were awarded as follows:

Engine Tuners' Championship

References

External links
   

Formula Three
Japanese Formula 3 Championship seasons
Japan Formula Three
Japanese Formula 3